Thomas Pell, 3rd Lord of Pelham Manor ( – September 3, 1739), was an American landowner who owned Pelham, New York, as well as land that now includes the eastern Bronx and southern Westchester County, New York.

Early life
Pell was born at Pelham Manor, in the Province of New York in 1686. He was the son of John Pell and the Rachel ( Pinckney) Pell. Among his siblings were Hannah Ward (née Pell), John Pell, Elizabeth Huestis (née Pell), Mary Pugsley Hunter (née Pell), Phillip Pell, and Ada Pell.

His father was the only son born to Ithamaria (née Reginald) Pell and the Rt. Rev. John Pell, D.D., a mathematician and political agent. His grandfather's only brother was Thomas Pell, a physician who was Gentleman of the Bedchamber to Charles I. His mother was the daughter of Jane (née Phippen) Pinckney and Phillip Pinckney II, who first settled in Boston, then Fairfield before buying, with nine other men, a large tract of land called "Ten Farms" on the Hutchinson River.

Career
Pell's grand-uncle had signed a treaty with Chief Wampage, and other Siwanoy Indian tribal members, that granted him  of tribal land, including part of the Bronx and land to the west along Long Island Sound in what is now Westchester County, extending west to the Hutchinson River and north to Mamaroneck. In 1666, the land was created into an entire enfranchised township and manor. As his grand-uncle died in 1669 without male heir, his father inherited the entirety of the manor.

Upon his father's death around 1712, Pell inherited the entirety of the manor which he managed and eventually divided amongst his children.

Personal life
Pell was married to married Anna (or Ann), daughter of Ninham-Wampage and granddaughter of Wampage I, Sachem of the Siwanoys, and the former Susanna Cole (daughter of William and Anne Hutchinson, who was killed during Kieft's War). Together, they were the parents of seven sons, issues include:

 Mary Pell (–1741), who married Samuel Sands.
 John Pell (1702–1773), who married Mary Totten.
 Joshua Pell (1706–1781), who became the 4th Lord of Pelham Manor and who married Phoebe Palmer, a daughter of John Palmer.
 Ann Pell (b. 1716), who married silversmith Samuel Broadhurst.
 Bersheba Pell (1720–1779), who married Theophilus Bartow.
 Joseph Pell 
 Thomas Pell 
 Philip Pell
 Caleb Pell 

Pell died at the manor house on September 3, 1739. Upon his death, each of his sons, Joseph, John, Thomas, Joshua, Philip, and Caleb Pell, received  of land.  Eldest son John had six sons, who all died without issue, the last being Richard Moore Pell, who died at the Manor in 1868. The 4th Lords son, Thomas Pell (b. 1744), who married Margaret Bartow, was the last owner of the property, which later passed into the possession of the Bartow family.

Descendants
Through his son Joshua, he was a grandfather of Benjamin Pell (c. 1750–1828), and a great-grandfather of horticulturist William Ferris Pell and merchant Alfred Sands Pell.

See also
Bartow-Pell Mansion

References
Notes

Sources

External links
Pell Graves in Pelham Bay Park.

1686 births
1739 deaths
People of the Province of New York
Pelham, New York
People from Pelham, New York
History of the Bronx
People from the Bronx
Pell family